The hairy-footed dunnart (Sminthopsis hirtipes) is a dunnart that has silver hairs on the soles of it hind feet accompanied by long hair on the side of its sole. It is an Australian marsupial similar to the Ooldea dunnart, with its upper body yellow-brown and lower body white in colour. Its tail is thin and pinkish-white and can be thickened at the base.

Distribution and habitat
This species inhabits three distinct areas;  around Monkey Mia Bay and Kilbarri in Western Australia, a large area where the border of South Australia, Northern Territory and Western Australia converge and a small area between the Northern Territory and Queensland border 100 km north of the South Australian border. Its habitat includes arid and semi-arid woodlands, heath, savannah grasslands.

Social organisation and breeding
The hairy-footed dunnart lives in burrows built by spiders, bull ants and other similar burrowing type species. Not much is known about the breeding cycle but the young are in the pouch by October and juveniles emerge by late April.

Diet
Its typical diet includes mainly small reptiles and arthropods.

References

External links
Australian Biological Resources Study

Dasyuromorphs
Mammals of Western Australia
Mammals of South Australia
Mammals of the Northern Territory
Marsupials of Australia
Mammals described in 1898
Taxa named by Oldfield Thomas